The 2019–20 NJIT Highlanders men's basketball team represented the New Jersey Institute of Technology in the 2019–20 NCAA Division I men's basketball season. The Highlanders, led by fourth-year head coach Brian Kennedy, played their home games at the Wellness and Events Center in Newark, New Jersey as members of the Atlantic Sun Conference. They finished the season 9–21, 6–10 in ASUN play to finish in eighth place. They lost in the quarterfinals of the ASUN tournament to Liberty.

This was the final season the Highlanders were a member of the ASUN. On June 14, 2020, it was announced that on they would become a full member of the America East Conference beginning July 1, 2020.

Previous season
The Highlanders finished the 2018–19 season 22–13 overall, 8–8 in ASUN play to finish in fifth place. In the ASUN tournament, they defeated Florida Gulf Coast in the quarterfinals, before losing to Lipscomb in the semifinals. They received an invitation to the CIT, where they defeated Quinnipiac in the first round, before losing to Hampton in the quarterfinals.

Roster

Schedule and results

|-
!colspan=12 style=| Non-conference regular season

|-
!colspan=9 style=| Atlantic Sun Conference regular season

|-
!colspan=12 style=| Atlantic Sun tournament
|-

|-

Source

References

NJIT Highlanders men's basketball seasons
NJIT Highlanders
NJIT Highlanders men's basketball
NJIT Highlanders men's basketball